Prunum cineraceum is a species of gastropods from the Marginellidae family. The scientific name of this species was first published in 1889 by Dall.

References

Marginellidae
Gastropods described in 1889